Man of the House is a 2005 American crime comedy film directed by Stephen Herek and starring Tommy Lee Jones. The film's plot revolves around Roland Sharp, a lonesome Texas Ranger who goes undercover as an assistant coach to protect a group of college cheerleaders who have witnessed a murder. Much of the film was shot in Austin, Texas on the University of Texas campus.

Texas Governor Rick Perry has a cameo appearance in the film as himself. Released on February 25, 2005, the film received negative reviews, and grossed just $21 million against a budget of $40 million, making it a box office disappointment.

Plot 
 
Two Texas Rangers, Roland Sharp and Maggie Swanson question Percy Stevens about the whereabouts of his former prison roommate, Morgan Ball, who they want to testify against organized crime boss John Cortland.

Sharp and Swanson track down Ball to the warehouse, where Ball gives Sharp a key in an attempt to buy him off. Instead, Sharp takes the key and forces Ball outside, where FBI agent Eddie Zane is waiting. As they talk, a sniper begins shooting, wounding Swanson and giving Ball a chance to escape (although Swanson is shot in the chest, she survives due to the bullet missing her heart). It is revealed the sniper is after Ball, and a group of cheerleaders from the University of Texas at Austin witness his murder. Agent Zane is found shot in the arm next to Ball's body and claims he didn't see the sniper.

Anne, Teresa, Evie, Heather, and Barb are taken to the police station, where they all have conflicting descriptions of the shooter. Sharp is given the task of protecting the girls at all times, because their fathers are worried about them. The information is relayed to him by the Governor of Texas.

It is revealed that Sharp is divorced and has a daughter, Emma who is in high school and doesn't feel as though her father had ever been around. John Cortland is exonerated from all charges pressed against him due to a lack of evidence. FBI Agent Zane is revealed to be working with Cortland, having killed Ball and shot himself in the arm.

Cortland scolds Zane for letting some "loose ends" escape, and Zane begins searching for Sharp and the cheerleaders; he also kills the sniper he hired. With Swanson in the hospital recovering from her near-fatal wound, Sharp and two additional Rangers must now pick the girls up from school and secure their sorority house. Sharp moves in with the girls and the two young Rangers working with him move into the fraternity house across the street, where they end up busting a drug deal.

Sharp sets some ground rules, including no cell phones. He also tells them to "cover up in his presence" (referring to the girls' revealing clothes). When they fail to comply, he orders a massive industrial air conditioner, forcing them to dress warmly. Sharp is posing as a cheerleading coach specializing in conditioning, and at a Longhorns football game he tackles an opposing team's mascot when the mascot approaches the girls with a gun, later revealed to be a water gun. Other humorous mishaps occur, but Sharp's relationship with the girls begins to strengthen; Barb even begins to develop a crush on him.

However, Sharp finds himself attracted to Barb's English teacher Molly who calls him into her office to complain about Barb's plagiarism. Later he invites her over for dinner, which the girls coach him through using an earpiece and tiny video screen. After they fall asleep, he turns it off and woos Molly himself. He admits to the girls about his last failed marriage and the way he feels about his estranged daughter. This interests Evie, who has a 4.0 GPA and wants to write a paper on Emma. She uses the house's "emergency phone" to call her, revealing Sharp's location to Zane, who had contacted Emma.

Sharp takes the girls to a "spirit rally", where he is forced to give a speech about cheerleading. He becomes more and more impassioned, proving to the girls he finally "gets it". The night is ruined, however, when Sharp realizes in the nick of time that somebody put a bomb under their van, and Teresa (who was convinced that nobody was after them) is almost killed when her seatbelt gets stuck. Sharp saves her, and she admits that maybe someone is trying to kill them.

Evie tells Sharp she contacted Emma, and when Sharp calls his daughter he learns that Zane has her. He tells Sharp to take the key Ball gave him to open a lockbox, both of them unaware the cheerleaders are listening in. The next day Sharp gets the money out of the lockbox and drives to where Zane instructs him. Zane gives Sharp instructions over a cell phone, telling him he will shoot Emma if Sharp disobeys. After Sharp handcuffs himself to the steering wheel, Zane thanks him and tells him he's a "good parent." Zane takes off with the money, Sharp's keys and phone, and Emma.

Zane and Emma get on a bus, but as it pulls away Sharp sees Barb in the back. As he wonders what is going on, Heather gets in the car with him and picks his handcuffs. They take off after the bus in a stolen Volkswagen Beetle. On the bus, Teresa pretends to go into labor and Evie demands the bus be stopped. She attempts to steal the bag with the money, but Zane pulls a gun and Evie runs away from the bus. Zane forces all of the other passengers and the driver out, taking over driving the bus himself.

Emma is rescued by the cheerleaders, but Zane attempts to drive to Mexico with the bag to hide. Sharp shoots a wheel, causing the bus to flip over 90 degrees. Zane gets out the bus, his face injured after he hits the bus's ceiling. The Mexico–United States border closes and the border officers draw guns on him. Rather than go to jail, Zane attempts suicide by cop. Sharp shoots the gun out of Zane's hand, and handcuffs him with the same cuffs from which Heather freed him earlier. He and Emma are reunited. At the end of the film, Cortland is arrested and taken back to court. Sharp and Molly are married, and Emma and the cheerleaders are part of the wedding.

Cast

Reception

Critical response
On Rotten Tomatoes, the film has an approval rating from critics of 9% based on 67 reviews, with an average rating of 3.4/10. The site's critical consensus reads, "A high concept movie that plays out like a mediocre TV sitcom." On Metacritic, the film has a score of 35 out of 100 based on 20 critics, indicating "generally unfavorable reviews". Audiences polled by CinemaScore gave the film an average grade of "B−" on an A+ to F scale.

James Berardinelli of ReelViews panned the film, rating it one star out of four and writing: "The movie is an "action comedy" in name only – there's nothing in Man of the House that could be considered funny or exciting." He also said the movie "manages to neuter Cedric the Entertainer's capacity for humor" since "not even he is able to deliver a legitimate laugh" and that Tommy Lee Jones "comes across as taciturn and unlikable."

Stephen Hunter of The Washington Post called the film "a one screen multiplex" with "a lot of small movies bouncing around inside it, but there's no big movie on the outside." Hunter felt that by the end the "many personalities" of the film have "grown tiresome". Nonetheless, he complimented Tommy Lee Jones' "deadpan" portrayal, saying "Whenever Herek doesn't know what to do -- and that's frequently -- he cuts to Jones, radiating world-weariness with the aplomb of Fred Astaire, and it's always funny."

Dana Stevens of The New York Times wrote: "Nearly every one of the film's emotional scenes is too predictable to hit its mark, but Mr. Jones's dry delivery has its moments." Stevens found Cedric the Entertainer to be disappointing, stating that he "fails for once to live up to his name".

Box office 
In its opening weekend, the film grossed $8,917,251 in 2,422 theaters in the United States and Canada, ranking #5 at the box office and averaging $3,681 per theater. The film closed on April 7, 2005, with a North American domestic gross of $19,699,706 and an international gross of $1,877,918 for a worldwide gross of $21,577,624. The film was released in the United Kingdom on April 8, 2005, and opened on #14.

Soundtrack 
 "We Are Family" – Pointer Sisters
 "Rising Sun" – Rusted Root
 "What U Gon' Do" – Lil Jon & the East Side Boyz
 "U Can't Touch This" – Tree Adams
 "All I Wanna Do" – Sheryl Crow
 "Should I Stay Or Should I Go" – The Clash
 "Funny How Time Slips Away" – Willie Nelson
 "Bad Moon Rising" – Creedence Clearwater Revival
 "Walkie Talkie Man" – Steriogram
 "I'm Too Sexy" – Right Said Fred

References

External links 
 
 
 

2005 films
2000s crime comedy films
2000s English-language films
Films about the Texas Ranger Division
Cheerleading films
Films set in Austin, Texas
Films shot in Austin, Texas
Films directed by Stephen Herek
Columbia Pictures films
Revolution Studios films
Films scored by David Newman
American crime comedy films
2005 comedy films
Films about witness protection
2000s American films